St. Christopher's Place is a short pedestrianised shopping street in Marylebone, central London between Oxford Street and Wigmore Street. Its retail units are smaller and higher-end than the major chains located on Oxford Street, similar to nearby South Molton Street.

The entire street lies within the Stratford Place conservation area.

References

Streets in the City of Westminster
Odonyms referring to religion
Shopping streets in London